Ketevan Andronikashvili (1754 – 3 June 1782) was a Georgian noblewoman and the first wife of the future king George XII of Georgia. She is known for the victory of Georgian cavalry under her personal command over the Lesgian mountaineers in 1778.

Biography 
Princess Ketevan was born into the Andronikashvili family, one of the leading noble houses of the eastern Georgian kingdom of Kakheti, claiming their descent from the Byzantine Komnenos dynasty. Her father, Prince Papuna Andronikashvili, was a royal bailiff, mouravi, of the district of Kiziqi. The identity of her mother is unknown. She had three brothers, Melkisedek, Iese, and Revaz.

Princess Ketevan married George, the eldest son of King Heraclius II and heir apparent to the throne of the Kingdom of Kartli and Kakheti in 1766. The marriage helped the Andronikashvili clan, especially Ketevan's brother Revaz, advance their cause at the royal court against the rival faction patronized by Heraclius II's consort Darejan Dadiani. By 1780, Darejan's party succeeded in reducing the Andronikashvili's influence, convincing Heraclius to remove Revaz Andronikashvili from the bailiffship of Kiziqi. Years later, in 1795, Prince Revaz would prevent the Kiziqian troops from coming to aid to the beleaguered king Heraclius, desperately battling the Persians at his capital city of Tbilisi.

The 24-year-old Ketevan commanded a respect and admiration in October 1778 for her role in the action at Ghartiskari, an episode of the long-running conflict between the Georgians and the Lesgians. Encountered by a marauding band of some 500 Lesgian mountaineers on the road to Tbilisi, Ketevan personally led her entourage of 300 cavalrymen into fighting and won a victory. Upon hearing the news, Heraclius II met his daughter-in-law with full military honors at the entrance of Tbilisi. She died, aged 28, in Tbilisi in 1782 as a result of the complications of her last childbirth. She was buried at the David Gareja monastery. A year later, George married secondly to Princess Mariam Tsitsishvili.

Children 
The sixteen years of Ketevan's marriage with George produced 12 children. These were:

 Prince David (1 July 1767 – 25 May 1819), prince-regent of Georgia (1800–1801).
 Prince Ioane (16 May 1768 – 15 February 1819), scholar and writer.
 Princess Barbare (1769 or 1770 – 1801), who married Prince Simon-Zosime Andronikashvili in 1784 and had three children.
 Prince Luarsab (1771 – before 1798), who died young.
 Princess Sophio (1771 – 28 September 1840), Lady of the Russian Order of St. Catherine, Lesser Cross, who married Prince Luarsab Tarkhan-Mouravi in 1792, without children.
 Princess Nino (15 April 1772 – 30 May 1847), wife of Grigol Dadiani, Prince of Mingrelia, and regent of Mingrelia (1804–1806).
 Princess Salome (c. 1773 – 3 January 1777), married Prince Alexander of Imereti.
 Prince Bagrat (8 May 1776 – 8 May 1841), writer, senator of the Russian Empire.
 Princess Ripsime (1779 – 27 May 1847), Lady of the Russian Order of St Catherine, Lesser Cross, who married Prince Dimitri Cholokashvili in 1784 and had two sons.
 Prince Solomon (1780 – before 1798), who died young.
 Princess Gaiane (27 September 1780 – 22 July 1820), who married Giorgi, Duke of Ksani, in 1794 and had issue.
 Prince Teimuraz (23 April 1782 – 25 October 1846), historian.

Ancestry

References 

1754 births
1782 deaths
Ketevan
18th-century people from Georgia (country)
People from Kakheti
Queens consort from Georgia (country)
Women in 18th-century warfare
Women in European warfare
Women in war in Western Asia
18th-century women from Georgia (country)
Deaths in childbirth